S. gigantea may refer to:
 Scea gigantea, a moth species found in South America
 Schizoglossa gigantea, a species of large predatory, air-breathing, land slug
 Scolopendra gigantea, the Peruvian giant yellowleg centipede or Amazonian giant centipede
 Spenceriella gigantea, the North Auckland worm, a rare giant annelid species endemic to New Zealand
 Spongiochloris gigantea, an alga species in the genus Spongiochloris
 Stapelia gigantea, a flowering plant species
 Stichodactyla gigantea, the giant carpet anemone, a species of sea anemone that lives in the Indo-Pacific area
 Strongylura gigantea, the needlefish, a marine fish species

Synonyms 
 Sequoia gigantea, a synonym for Sequoiadendron giganteum, a massive tree species

See also 
 Gigantea (disambiguation)